Lee Wung Yew,  (born 19 March 1966) is a Singaporean sport shooter. He is a three-time Olympian, a six-time Asian Games competitor, and a thirteen-time Southeast Asian Games medalist (1985–2009). Because of his long-term success and full commitment to the sport, Lee was named Singapore's Sportsman of the Year in 1990 and in 1998. He was also conferred the Public Service Medal and Public Service Star for his contribution to sports. He is currently teaching at Assumption English School as a Physical Education teacher.

Shooting career
Lee started his sporting career at the age of fifteen, when his father Lee Eng Hong convinced him to shoot a gun. Four years later, Lee qualified for the 1985 Southeast Asian Games in Bangkok, Thailand, where he won a gold medal, as a member of the Singaporean shooting team, in men's trap shooting. At the 1989 Southeast Asian Games in Kuala Lumpur, Malaysia, Lee captured his first ever individual gold medal in the same discipline, striking a total of 181 clay pigeons. In 1992, Lee graduated from Nanyang Technological University, with a bachelor's degree in physical education and a master of business administration degree major in sports management.

Lee made his official debut for the 1996 Summer Olympics in Atlanta, Georgia, where he became the nation's flag bearer in the opening ceremonies. He placed twentieth in the first ever men's trap shooting, with a score of 119 clay pigeons, tying his position with ten other shooters including United States' Bret Erickson and Kuwait's Fehaid Al Deehani.  The following year, Lee reached his breakthrough season in shooting, when he captured four gold medals in both trap and double trap at the Southeast Asian Games in Jakarta, Indonesia. Lee also competed for the second time in the men's trap at the 2004 Summer Olympics in Athens, where he placed twenty-first out of thirty-five shooters in the preliminary rounds, striking a total of 115 clay pigeons.

Twelve years after competing in his first Olympics, Lee qualified for his third Singaporean team, as a 42-year-old, at the 2008 Summer Olympics in Athens, by placing third from the 2007 Asian Shooting Championships in Kuwait City, Kuwait, with a total of 133 birds. He scored a total of 110 clay pigeons in the preliminary rounds of the men's trap, by three points ahead of Ireland's Derek Burnett from the final attempt, finishing only in twenty-eighth place.

References

External links
 
Profile – Singapore National Olympic Committee
NBC Olympics Profile

Singaporean male sport shooters
Trap and double trap shooters
Living people
Singaporean people of Cantonese descent
Olympic shooters of Singapore
Shooters at the 1996 Summer Olympics
Shooters at the 2004 Summer Olympics
Shooters at the 2008 Summer Olympics
1966 births
Asian Games medalists in shooting
Shooters at the 1994 Asian Games
Shooters at the 1998 Asian Games
Shooters at the 2002 Asian Games
Shooters at the 2006 Asian Games
Shooters at the 2010 Asian Games
Commonwealth Games competitors for Singapore
Shooters at the 1990 Commonwealth Games
Shooters at the 1998 Commonwealth Games
Shooters at the 2002 Commonwealth Games
Shooters at the 2006 Commonwealth Games
Shooters at the 2010 Commonwealth Games
Recipients of the Pingat Bakti Masyarakat
Recipients of the Bintang Bakti Masyarakat
Asian Games bronze medalists for Singapore
Southeast Asian Games silver medalists for Singapore
Southeast Asian Games bronze medalists for Singapore
Southeast Asian Games gold medalists for Singapore
Southeast Asian Games medalists in shooting
Medalists at the 1998 Asian Games
Competitors at the 2005 Southeast Asian Games
Competitors at the 2007 Southeast Asian Games